Justice Hayes may refer to:

Charles R. Hayes (1899–1968), associate justice of the South Dakota Supreme Court
Thomas L. Hayes (1926–1987), associate justice of the Vermont Supreme Court

See also
 Justice Hays (disambiguation)